Highertown is a hamlet in Cornwall, England. It is on the western edge of Bodmin Moor in the parish of Advent.

References

Hamlets in Cornwall